Patrick Mayo (born 15 May 1973 in Port Elizabeth, Eastern Cape) is a retired South African association football player who played as a defender, midfielder and striker. Most recently, Mayo served as an assistant coach to Chippa United's MultiChoice Diski Challenge team.

International career
Mayo made 18 appearances for the South Africa national soccer team.

Personal life
Mayo is the father of the footballer Khanyisa Mayo.

References

1973 births
Living people
South African soccer players
South Africa international soccer players
Sportspeople from Port Elizabeth
Kaizer Chiefs F.C. players
SuperSport United F.C. players
Bush Bucks F.C. players
2004 African Cup of Nations players
Association football defenders
Association football midfielders
Association football forwards
Association football utility players
Bay United F.C. players
Soccer players from the Eastern Cape